NGC 3315 is a lenticular galaxy located about 185 million light-years away in the constellation Hydra. It was discovered by astronomer Edward Austin on March 24, 1870. It is a member of the Hydra Cluster.

See also 
 List of NGC objects (3001–4000)
 NGC 3305

References

External links

Hydra Cluster
Hydra (constellation)
Lenticular galaxies
3315 
31540 
Astronomical objects discovered in 1870
Discoveries by Edward Austin